Heterorhachis is a genus of South African flowering plants in the daisy family.

There is only one known species, Heterorhachis aculeata, native to South Africa.

References

Arctotideae
Monotypic Asteraceae genera
Endemic flora of South Africa